One Door Mental Health is the new name for the Schizophrenia Fellowship of New South Wales Inc (SFNSW) a community based not for profit organisation that provides a range of services for people with mental illness, their families, and carers. One Door Mental Health operates predominantly in the Australian state of New South Wales.

History
SFNSW began in 1985 with a public meeting that was attended by over 300 people. It was incorporated in 1986.

In February 2017, the Schizophrenia Fellowship of New South Wales renamed to One Door Mental Health.

Services
One Door Mental Health provides programs predominantly across NSW including:
 Carer services including carer advocates, carer education sessions, carer respite, support groups, young carer programs, NDIS for carers. 
 Centre-based services including Berrima Cottage Bowral, Endeavour Clubhouse Port Macquarie, Frangipani House Parramatta, Harmony House Campbelltown, Helping Hands Nowra, Hercules House Chatswood, Light & Hope House Wollongong, Pioneer Clubhouse Balgowlah, Sunflower House Ulladulla & Wagga Wagga.  
 Education and Training http://www.onedoor.org.au/events/workshops  
 Employment
 Healthcare including NDIS 
 Individual Support including information & support helpline, Hospital to Home, Western Sydney Recovery College, and Partners in Recovery. 
 Support Groups http://www.onedoor.org.au/services/support-groups/support-groups-list 
 Youth Support including the On Fire program and managing headspace sites around NSW.

Awards
1995 Mental Health Matters Award, Mental Health Association NSW, awarded to Schizophrenia Fellowship of NSW for positive awareness of mental health and sunflower logo 
1998 Transcultural Mental Health Centre Award for Excellence awarded to NOUS 
1999 Community Service Award, Western Sydney Area Health Service awarded to NOUS 
2003 Certificate of Commendation, Mental Health Association NSW awarded to NOUS 
2003 Lilly Partnerships in Wellbeing Gold Award awarded to On Fire! 
2004 Mental Health Matters Award for Non-Government or Community Organisation, 	Mental      Health Association NSW awarded to Carers Support Unit (now Carer Assist) 
2005 Premio Internacional El Ojo de Iberoamerica Award awarded to Avant Card campaign 
2006 TheMHS Gold Award for Carer Services awarded to Carer Assist 
2007 International Free Card Award, Social and Environment Category awarded to Avant Card      campaign

References

External links
Onedoor.org.au
Living A Full Life With Schizophrenia
Mental Illness Fellowship of Australia (MIFA)

Schizophrenia-related organizations
Mental health organisations in Australia